Shane Blaney (born 20 January 1999) is an Irish professional footballer who plays as a defender for Scottish club Motherwell.

Early and personal life
Blaney was born in Letterkenny.

Career

Finn Harps
Blaney began his career with Finn Harps, captaining their under-17 team and also playing for their under-19 team. He made his senior debut in the 2017 season, making 3 League of Ireland appearances. He signed a new contract for the 2018 season in December 2017.

Doncaster Rovers
He turned professional in January 2018 after signing a two-and-a-half-year contract with English club Doncaster Rovers in January 2018. He moved on loan to Tamworth in July 2018 for an intended six months. He returned sooner and then moved on loan to Grantham Town in October 2018 for a month, making four appearances in all competitions. Blaney signed for Blyth Spartans on loan in February 2020. He was released by Doncaster at the end of the 2019–20 season.

Sligo Rovers
He signed for Sligo Rovers for the 2021 season.

Motherwell
In December 2022 it was announced that he would sign for Scottish club Motherwell in January 2023.

International career
Blaney represented Ireland at schoolboy level, captaining the side.

Career statistics

References

1999 births
Living people
Republic of Ireland association footballers
Finn Harps F.C. players
Doncaster Rovers F.C. players
Tamworth F.C. players
Grantham Town F.C. players
Sligo Rovers F.C. players
League of Ireland players
Association football defenders
Republic of Ireland expatriate association footballers
Irish expatriate sportspeople in England
Expatriate footballers in England
Irish expatriate sportspeople in Scotland
Expatriate footballers in Scotland
Motherwell F.C. players
Scottish Professional Football League players